Fateh is an Arabic-language name that translates to "conqueror". It is used in many other languages across the Muslim world and in societies that have significant Islamic influence.

As a given name 

 Fateh (name)
 Fatih (name)

Groups and places 
 Fatah, a Palestinian nationalist political party
 Fateh Oil Field, an oil-producing area situated near Dubai in the United Arab Emirates
 Al Fateh Grand Mosque, a mosque in Bahrain
 El Fateh, a city in Egypt
 Al Fateh Sports Club, a Saudi Arabian multi-sports club
 Al Fateh, an Arabic-language children's magazine with links to Hamas, a Palestinian nationalist militant organization

Films 
 Fateh (1991 film), a 1991 Hindi-language Indian film
 Fateh (2014 film), a 2014 Punjabi-language Indian film

Other 
 Fateh-110, an Iranian tactical short-range ballistic missile
 Fateh-313, an Iranian tactical short-range ballistic missile
 Fateh-class submarine, an Iranian class of semi-heavy submarines

See also
 Fatah (disambiguation)
 Fattah (disambiguation)
 Fatteh, an Egyptian and Levantine dish